Salmanabad (also Romanized as Salmānābād) is a village in Mohammadabad Rural District, in the Central District of Marvdasht County, Fars Province, Iran. At the 2006 census, its population was 15, in 4 families.

References 

Populated places in Marvdasht County